The Vendée Arctique is a single-handed (solo) yacht race, from France to the Arctic Circle and back.

The race

History 
The race was founded by in 2020, as a qualifier for the Vendée Globe following the cancellation of a number of the qualifying races due to COVID-19. It is named after the Département of Vendée, in France, where the race starts and ends. The race starts and finishes in Les Sables-d'Olonne, in the Département of Vendée, in France.

The concept of a series of events heading up to the northern high latitudes with the intention of this race become a permanent fixture.

The race is open to monohull yachts conforming to the Open 60 class criteria.

Race Editions

1st Edition: 2020

2nd Edition: 2022

See also 

IMOCA races
 Vendee Globe, a non-stop single person race around the World, currently run using the IMOCA 60 Class.
 The Barcelona World Race, a non-stop two person race around the World, currently run using the IMOCA 60 Class.
 Route du Rhum
 Transat Jacque Verbe

References

External links 

Recurring events established in 2020
Single-handed sailing competitions
Yachting races
Sailing competitions in France